Eret is an unincorporated community in Wayne County, Mississippi, United States.

The town was named for the late wife of Fred Clark, who owned most of the land in the area.

Eret was located on the Mobile and Ohio Railroad, built through Mississippi in the 1850s.  The town never had a post office, and never incorporated.

References

Unincorporated communities in Wayne County, Mississippi
Unincorporated communities in Mississippi